Nabendu Ghosh (27 March 1917 – 15 December 2007) was an Indian author in Bengali literature, and screenwriter. He has written screenplays of classic Bollywood movies like, Sujata, Bandini, Devdas, Majhli Didi, Abhimaan and Teesri Kasam. He has written stories for movies like Baap Beti, Shatranj, Raja Jani. He has also acted briefly in Do Bigha Zameen, Teesri Kasam and Lukochuri. Later in his career, he directed four movies as well.

Biography
Nabendu Ghosh was born 27 March 1917 in Dhaka (presently in Bangladesh). At the age of 12 he became a popular actor on stage. As an acclaimed dancer in Uday Shankar style, he won several medals between 1939 and 1945. Ghosh lost a government job in 1944 for writing Dak Diye Jaai, set against the Quit India Movement launched by Indian National Congress. The novel catapulted him to fame and he moved to Calcutta in 1945. He soon ranked among the most progressive young writers in Bengali literature.

After partition, Urdu was declared the state language of East Pakistan; thereby banning all Bengali literature and films. It was this political division that prompted Nabendu Ghosh to join Bimal Roy in 1951, when he left New Theatres in Kolkata, to make films for Bombay Talkies. Others in the team who also shifted were Hrishikesh Mukherjee, Asit Sen, Paul Mahendra, Kamal Bose and later Salil Chaudhury. After Bimal Roy's death, Ghosh worked extensively with Hrishikesh Mukherjee.

Nabendu Ghosh has written on all historical upheavals of 1940s – famine, riots, partition – as well as love. His oeuvre bears the distinct stamp of his outlook towards life. His literary efforts are 'pointing fingers.' There is a multi-coloured variety, a deep empathy for human emotions, mysterious layers of meaning, subtle symbolism, description of unbearable life. Love for humanity is also reflected in his writings. He has to his credit 26 novels and 14 collections of short story. He directed the film Trishagni (1988), based on Saradindu Bandopadhyay's historical short story Maru O Sangha.

He died on 15 December 2007. He is survived by two sons, Dr Dipankar and filmmaker Shubhankar, and daughter Ratnottama Sengupta (film festival curator, author, and former The Times of India film journalist). His wife Kanaklata had died in 1999. His autobiography, Eka Naukar Jatri  was published in March 2008. His daughter-in-law, Dr Soma Ghosh is an acclaimed classical vocalist, and was conferred with the Padma Shree award in 2016.

To commemorate his birth centenary, an English translation of his science fiction novel, Aami o Aami (1999), was released on 25 March 2017. He had worked on the translation with his grandson, Devottam Sengupta. The book is known as Me and I in English.

Filmography
Screenwriter
Parineeta (1953)
Biraj Bahu (1954)
 Baadbaan (1954)
 Aar Paar (1954)
Devdas (1955)
Yahudi (1958)
 Insan Jaag Utha (1959)
Sujata (1959)
Bandini (1963)
 Teesri Kasam (1966)
  Majhli Didi (1967)
 Sharafat (1970)
 Lal Patthar (1971)
 Abhimaan (1973)
 Jheel Ke Us Paar (1973)
 Do Anjaane (1976)
 Ganga Ki Saugandh (1978)
 Krodhi (1981)
Director
 Parineeta (1953) (assistant director)
 Trishagni (1988)
 Netraheen Sakshi (1992)
 Ladkiyaan (1997)
 Anmol Ratan: Ashok Kumar (Documentary/ 1995)

Awards

Literary awards
Bankim Puraskar from the Bangla Academy, Govt. of West Bengal
Haraprasad Ghosh Medal from Bangiya Sahitya Parishad
Bibhuti Bhushan Sahitya Arghya
Bimal Mitra Puraskar
Amrita Puraskar

Film awards
 1997: Honoris Causa conferred by Film and Television Institute of India for his "Significant Contribution to Indian Cinema"
 1988: National Film Award for Best First Film of a Director – Trishagni
 1969: Filmfare Best Screenplay Award, Majhli Didi (1969)
 BFJA Award for Best Screenplay: Majhli Didi (1969)
 BFJA Award for Best Screenplay: Teesri Kasam (1967)
  Film World Award for Best Screenplay (Do Anjaane)

References

 
 Mukul (2010), 20-minute documentary by Subhankar Ghosh.

External links
 
Nabendu Ghosh profile at Upperstall

1917 births
2007 deaths
Bengali-language writers
People from Dhaka
Bengali novelists
Bengali writers
Indian male screenwriters
Filmfare Awards winners
Bengal Film Journalists' Association Award winners
Indian autobiographers
Hindi-language film directors
Bangladeshi screenwriters
20th-century Bangladeshi writers
20th-century Indian dramatists and playwrights
20th-century Indian film directors
20th-century Bangladeshi male writers
Novelists from West Bengal
Screenwriters from Kolkata
20th-century Indian novelists
Film directors from Kolkata
Director whose film won the Best Debut Feature Film National Film Award
Producers who won the Best Debut Feature Film of a Director National Film Award
20th-century Indian screenwriters